XXXXIX Mountain Corps was a mountain corps of the German Army during World War II that participated in the invasion of Yugoslavia.

In June 1941, it participated in Operation Barbarossa as part of Army Group South. It fought in the Battle of Uman, the Battle of the Sea of Azov, the Battle of Rostov (1941), and the Kerch–Eltigen Operation (1943). The Corps fought the rest of the war on the Eastern Front and withdrew through Ukraine and Slovakia to the area around Havlíčkův Brod in Bohemia, where it surrendered to the Soviets in May 1945.

Commanders 
Commanding generals
 General der Gebirgstruppe Ludwig Kübler (25 October 1940 - 19 December 1941)
 General der Gebirgstruppe Rudolf Konrad (19 December 1941 - 26 July 1943)
 General der Infanterie Helge Auleb (26 July - 15 August 1943)
 General der Gebirgstruppe Rudolf Konrad (15 August 1943 - 15 February 1944)
 General der Infanterie Friedrich Köchling (15 February - 15 March 1944)
 General der Gebirgstruppe Rudolf Konrad (15 March - 10 May 1944)
 General der Artillerie Walter Hartmann (10 May - 26 July 1944)
 General der Infanterie Franz Beyer (26 July - 4 August 1944)
 General der Artillerie Walter Hartmann (4-5 August 1944)
 General der Gebirgstruppe Karl von Le Suire (5 August 1944 - 8 May 1945)

Chiefs of Staff
 Oberst Ferdinand Jodl (25 October 1940 - 6 January 1942)
 Generalmajor Josef Kübler (6 January 1942 - 19 January 1943)
 Oberst Wolf-Dietrich von Xylander (19 January - 1 June 1943)
 Oberst Ernst Michael (1 Juni - 5 August 1943)
 Oberst Wilhelm Haidlen (5 August 1943 - 30 May 1944)
 Oberst Kurt von Einem (30 May - 5 August 1944)
 Oberst Wilhelm Haidlen (5 August 1944 - 1 February 1945)
 Oberstleutnant Ludwig von Eimannsberger (1 February - 5 April 1945)
 Oberstleutnant Werner Vogl (5 April - May 1945)

Notes

References

 

M49
Military units and formations established in 1940
Military units and formations disestablished in 1940
Military units and formations disestablished in 1945